Flatomorpha is a genus of planthoppers in the family Flatidae. It was first described by Leopold Melichar in 1901.

The species in the genus are:

 Flatomorpha biglypta Medler, 1999
 Flatomorpha disguisa Medler, 1999
 Flatomorpha inclusa Melichar, 1902
 Flatomorpha robusta Medler, 1996
 Flatomorpha rubrata Medler, 1999
 Flatomorpha umbrimargo (Walker, 1858)

References 

Flatidae
Auchenorrhyncha genera